Land Where I Flee is a novel by Indian writer Prajwal Parajuly. It was published on November 14, 2013 by Quercus. It is the first novel and the second book of the author who had previously published a collection of short stories titled The Gurkha's Daughter which was shortlisted for Dylan Thomas Prize.

Synopsis 
The book centers around a Nepali-Indian family from the state of Sikkim. Chitralekha Neupaney, a 84 year old woman is the matriarch of the family who has raised her grandchildren after their parents passed away. On the occasion of her 84th birthday (Chaurasi), there is a reunion in the family of those four grandchildren who live in different parts of the world. Prasanti is the eunuch maid of the house who is very bossy. The novel deals with various themes like identity and family.

Characters 

 Chitralekha Neupaney, a 84 year old matriarch of the house
 Prasanti, the eunuch help of the household
 Bhagwati, one of the four grandchildren
 Agastya, one of the four grandchildren
 Ruthwa, one of the four grandchildren
 Manasa, one of the four grandchildren

Translation 
It was translated into French as Fuir et Revenir by Benoîte Dauvergne.

Reception 
The French translation of the book was nominated for France’s First Novel Prize. The book was also longlisted for  the Emile Guimet Prize. Manjula Narayan of Hindustan Times praised the book as "one of the best novels of the year' in his review. Jane Housham called it as "a caustic look at family life" in her review for The Guardian.

See also 

 The Gurkha's Daughter
 Faatsung
 The Wayward Daughter

References 

2013 Indian novels
Novels with gay themes
LGBT literature in India
Novels set in Sikkim
Quercus (publisher) books